The Eliseni is a right tributary of the river Târnava Mare in Romania. It discharges into the Târnava Mare in Șoard.

References

Rivers of Romania
Rivers of Harghita County
Rivers of Mureș County